Deck The Halls is a 2003 thriller novel by Mary Higgins Clark and Carol Higgins Clark.

References

2003 American novels
Collaborative novels
Christmas novels
Novels by Mary Higgins Clark
Novels by Carol Higgins Clark